The 2022 United States Senate special election in Oklahoma was held on November 8, 2022, to elect a member of the United States Senate for Oklahoma. The election took place concurrently with the regularly scheduled election for Oklahoma's other Senate seat. The candidate filing deadline was between April 13–15, 2022.

This special election was held to fill the remaining four years of incumbent Republican Senator Jim Inhofe's fifth term. In February 2022, Inhofe announced that he would resign early at the end of the 117th United States Congress on January 3, 2023. He was first elected in the 1994 special election with 55% of the vote, succeeding retiring Democratic Senator David Boren. Most recently, Inhofe won re-election to a fifth full term in 2020 with 63% of the vote.

Former U.S. Representative Kendra Horn secured the Democratic nomination by default, while the primary election for the Republican nomination took place on June 28, 2022. U.S. Representative Markwayne Mullin won the Republican primary runoff on August 23, defeating former State House Speaker T. W. Shannon.  Mullin won the election.

Mullin, a member of the Cherokee Nation, became the first Native American to serve in the U.S. Senate since fellow Republican Ben Nighthorse Campbell retired from Congress in 2005, and the first Native American representing this state since Robert Owen in 1925. Horn won Oklahoma County, making her the first Democrat since 2008 to carry any Oklahoma county in a Senate election.

Republican primary 
On February 25, 2022, Jim Inhofe, the state's longest-serving U.S. Senator, announced he would leave office at the end of the 117th Congress, triggering a special election for his U.S. Senate seat in Oklahoma.
A crowded field of candidates was expected in the Republican primary following the announcement of Inhofe's retirement.

Luke Holland, Inhofe's former chief of staff, launched his campaign for Inhofe's seat on the same day with Inhofe's endorsement. The next day, Markwayne Mullin, a U.S. Representative for Oklahoma's 2nd congressional district, announced his campaign. By February 28, Oklahoma State Senator Nathan Dahm had announced he was switching his campaign from running for Oklahoma's Class III seat to running for the special election seat. On March 8, former United States National Security Council chief of staff Alex Gray announced his campaign. T. W. Shannon, a former Speaker of the Oklahoma House of Representatives, officially announced his campaign on March 11. Scott Pruitt, former Administrator of the Environmental Protection Agency, filed to run on April 15.

Candidates

Nominee
Markwayne Mullin, U.S. representative for

Eliminated in runoff
T. W. Shannon, former speaker of the Oklahoma House of Representatives (2013–2014), former state representative for the 62nd district (2007–2015), and candidate for U.S. Senate in 2014

Eliminated in initial primary
Michael Coibion
Jessica Jean Garrison, author, dietician and daughter of former state senator Earl Garrison
Randy Grellner, physician
Luke Holland, former chief of staff for U.S. Senator Jim Inhofe
Adam Holley, office manager
Laura Moreno
Scott Pruitt, former Administrator of the Environmental Protection Agency (2017–2018) and former attorney general of Oklahoma (2011–2017)
Paul Royse
John Tompkins, orthopedic surgeon and candidate for U.S. Senate in 2020

Withdrew before primary
Alex Gray, former United States National Security Council chief of staff (Endorsed Luke Holland in primary and Markwayne Mullin in runoff)

Declined
G. T. Bynum, mayor of Tulsa
Gentner Drummond, attorney (running for attorney general)
Jackson Lahmeyer, pastor (ran for the Class 3 U.S. Senate seat)
Frank Lucas, U.S. representative for Oklahoma's 3rd congressional district (running for re-election) 
Charles McCall, Speaker of the Oklahoma House of Representatives
Kyle McCarter, former U.S. Ambassador to Kenya
John M. O'Connor, attorney general of Oklahoma (running for attorney general)
Matt Pinnell, lieutenant governor of Oklahoma (running for re-election)
Kevin Stitt, governor of Oklahoma (running for re-election)
R. Trent Shores, former U.S. attorney for the Northern District of Oklahoma (2017–2021)
Greg Treat, president pro tempore of the Oklahoma Senate
J. C. Watts, former U.S. representative for Oklahoma's 4th congressional district (1995–2003)
Paul Wesselhoft, legislator for the 9th district of the Citizen Potawatomi Nation (2007–present) and former state representative for the 54th district (2004–2016)

First round

Endorsements

Debates

Polling

Results

Runoff

Endorsements

Debates

Polling

Results

Democratic nomination 
Former U.S. Representative Kendra Horn was the only Democrat to file to run and was automatically awarded the Democratic nomination.

General election

Candidates
Markwayne Mullin (Republican), U.S. Representative for 
Kendra Horn (Democratic), former U.S. Representative for 
Robert Murphy (Libertarian), retired University of Oklahoma data technician, U.S. Marine Corps veteran, and carpenter
Ray Woods (Independent), candidate for U.S. Senate in 2014

Predictions

Endorsements

Polling
Aggregate polls

Graphical summary

Results

See also 
 2022 United States Senate elections
 2022 Oklahoma elections
 118th United States Congress
 List of special elections to the United States Senate

Notes

References

External links 
 Official campaign websites
Kendra Horn (D) for Senate
Markwayne Mullin (R) for Senate
Robert Murphy (L) for Senate

2022 special
Oklahoma special
United States Senate special
Oklahoma 2022
United States Senate 2022
Oklahoma Senate 2022